Franz Schönfels (5 August 1913 – 25 September 2005) was an Austrian water polo player. He competed in the men's tournament at the 1936 Summer Olympics.

References

1913 births
2005 deaths
Austrian male water polo players
Olympic water polo players of Austria
Water polo players at the 1936 Summer Olympics
Place of birth missing